Brazil competed at the 1988 Summer Paralympics in Seoul, South Korea. 59 competitors from Brazil won 27 medals including 4 gold, 9 silver and 14 bronze and finished 26th in the medal table.

See also 
 Brazil at the Paralympics
 Brazil at the 1988 Summer Olympics

References 

Nations at the 1988 Summer Paralympics
1988
Summer Paralympics